The 2021–22 A-League Women, known as the Liberty A-League for sponsorship reasons, was the fourteenth season of the A-League Women, the Australian national women's association football competition originally known as the W-League until the previous season. Wellington Phoenix were announced as an expansion club, taking the total teams to 10.

Sydney FC were the defending premiers, having won their third premiership title in 2020–21. Melbourne Victory were the defending champions, having won their second championship title in 2020–21. Both clubs managed to defend their respective title this season.

Clubs

Stadiums and locations

Personnel and kits

Managerial changes

Transfers

Foreign players

The following do not fill a Visa position:
A Australian citizens who have chosen to represent another national team
G Guest Players
R Injury Replacement Players, or National Team Replacement Players

Regular season

League table

Fixtures and results

Matches
The draw for the season was confirmed in November 2021.
 All times are in AEDT (UTC+11:00)

Round 1

Round 2

Round 3

Round 4

Round 5

Round 6

Round 7

Round 8

Round 9

Round 10

Round 11

Round 12

Round 13

Round 14

Regular season statistics

Top scorers

Hat-tricks

Notes
5 Player scored 5 goals
(H) – Home team
(A) – Away team

Clean sheets

Finals series

Bracket

Semi-finals

Preliminary Final

Grand Final

End-of-season awards
The following end of the season awards were announced at the 2021–22 Dolan Warren Awards night on 26 May 2022.
 Julie Dolan Medal – Fiona Worts (Adelaide United)
 Young Player of the Year – Holly McNamara (Melbourne City)
 Golden Boot Award – Fiona Worts (Adelaide United) (13 goals)
 Goalkeeper of the Year – Casey Dumont (Melbourne Victory)
 Coach of the Year – Adrian Stenta (Adelaide United)
 Referee of the Year – Lara Lee
 Goal of the Year – Rachel Lowe (Sydney FC v Wellington Phoenix, 30 December 2021)

See also

 2021–22 A-League Men
A-League Women transfers for 2021–22 season
2021–22 Canberra United FC (A-League Women) season
2021–22 Newcastle Jets FC (A-League Women) season
2021–22 Sydney FC (A-League Women) season  
2021–22 Wellington Phoenix FC (A-League Women) season

Notes

References

Australia
2021–22
2021–22 in Australian women's soccer
2021–22 A-League Women